Tiny Toon Adventures 2: Trouble in Wackyland is a Tiny Toon Adventures-based video game, released on the Nintendo Entertainment System in 1993, and developed and published by Konami. The story involves Montana Max inviting everyone to a new amusement park in Acme Acres, under the alias of a "secret admirer".

Gameplay

There are five areas which the player can explore, each one starring a different character: Plucky rides a bumper car, Hamton rides a train, Babs rides a rollercoaster, Furrball dodges Sweetie on a log ride, and Buster explores a Funhouse. Similarly to the game's predecessor, Roderick Rat and other villainous characters from the television show try to interfere with the Tiny Toons. Additional characters from the series make cameo appearances throughout the game.

Each ride costs a certain number of tickets, but as the player racks up points on the various rides, more tickets are earned. Eventually, when enough tickets have been earned, they can be saved until the player has enough to afford the entrance fee to the Funhouse, where Buster Bunny must then navigate numerous obstacles before squaring off with the "Secret Admirer", who turns out to be Montana Max.

Notes

References

External links

1992 video games
Konami games
Nintendo Entertainment System games
Nintendo Entertainment System-only games
Platform games
Video games based on Tiny Toon Adventures
Video games set in amusement parks
Video game sequels
Video games developed in Japan